The 1980 Arizona State Sun Devils football team represented Arizona State University during the 1980 NCAA Division I-A football season.

Schedule

Roster

Game summaries

at Ohio State

at Arizona

References

Arizona State
Arizona State Sun Devils football seasons
Arizona State Sun Devils football